Jeff Turcotte (born c. 1952) is a retired Canadian football player who played for the Ottawa Rough Riders of the Canadian Football League (CFL). He played college football at the University of Colorado.

References

1950s births
Living people
Canadian football tackles
American football tackles
Colorado Buffaloes football players
Ottawa Rough Riders players
Players of Canadian football from Ontario
Canadian football people from Ottawa